Gamal Mahmoud Ahmed El-Ghandour (born June 12, 1957) is a retired Egyptian referee.

Details 
El-Ghandour has refereed the 2002 African Cup of Nations final (Cameroon vs Senegal), the second leg of the 2002 African Cup Winners' Cup final (Kotoko (Gha) 2:1 WAC (Mar)), and five successive African Cup of Nations, 1994, 1996, 1998, 2000, and 2002. He is the first African referee to run a match in the UEFA European Football Championship. He has also participated in one Olympic Games, one FIFA Confederation Cup (2001), and one AFC Asian Cup.

He also refereed 1996 Asian Cup.In the Semi-Final match between Iran and saudi arabia and he controversially disallowed one Iranian goal and did not announce a clear penalty for Iran ; he also refereed in two FIFA World Cups, France 1998 and Korea/Japan 2002. In the South Korea vs. Spain match in the 2002 World Cup, he controversially disallowed two Spanish goals and his linesmen—one Ugandan, the other Trinidadian—judged one Spanish attack after another to be offside.

He is also the first Egyptian referee to play as a professional referee (Japanese League 1999).

International match list

References

External links 
 Profile
 Gamal El-Ghandour

1957 births
Living people
Egyptian football referees
Place of birth missing (living people)
FIFA World Cup referees
1998 FIFA World Cup referees
2002 FIFA World Cup referees
Olympic football referees
UEFA Euro 2000 referees
AFC Asian Cup referees